During the 1994–95 English football season, Reading F.C. competed in the Football League First Division, following promotion from the Second Division the previous season.

Season summary
Mark McGhee left Reading in December to take over at Leicester City. Players Jimmy Quinn, Mick Gooding, Ady Williams and Jeff Hopkins acted as caretakers until January, when Quinn and Gooding were named as full-time player-managers. The inexperienced duo led Reading to second in the First Division. In any other season this would have been enough for promotion to the Premier League, but due to restructuring of the league, only two teams would be awarded promotion, and therefore Reading entered the play-offs. After beating Tranmere Rovers 3–1 on aggregate (3–1 and 0–0 over two legs) they travelled to Wembley to face Bolton Wanderers. Reading were 2–0 up within 12 minutes and appeared certain to be playing top-flight football for the first time in their history next season, but Bolton fought back to score twice in the last 15 minutes to take the game to extra time. Bolton scored twice more in extra time to lead 4–2. Although player-manager Quinn, on as a second-half substitute, pulled one back in the 119th minute, Bolton held on to win and sealed promotion to the Premier League at Reading's expense. Following the final defeat, it would be eleven years before Reading finally experienced top-flight football.

Squad

Left club during season

Transfers

In

Loans In

Released

Competitions

Division two

Results

League table

Play-offs

Final

FA Cup

League Cup

Squad statistics

Appearances and goals

|-
|colspan="14"|Players who appeared for Reading but left during the season:

|}

Goal Scorers

Team kit
Reading's kit for the 1994–95 was manufactured by Pelada, and the main sponsor was Auto Trader.

Notes

References

Soccerbase.com

Reading F.C. seasons
Reading